Richard Byrne (died 28 August 1942) was an Irish nationalist politician in Northern Ireland.

Byrne worked as a publican and was also a landlord.  He was elected to Belfast City Council in 1910, serving until his death.  At the 1921 Northern Ireland general election, Byrne unsuccessfully contested Belfast West.

Byrne contested Belfast Falls at the 1929 Northern Ireland general election.  This came with the reluctant support of party leader Joseph Devlin, who described Byrne as a "Tory" and an "old pisspot".  The contest was bitter, with Northern Ireland Labour Party opponent Billy McMullen producing a newspaper, the Northern Worker, claiming that Byrne was a slum landlord. Byrne secured an injunction to stop distribution two days before the election, and beat McMullen by around 1,400 votes.

From 1937 until his death, Byrne and Thomas Joseph Campbell were the only Nationalist Party members to regularly attend the Northern Ireland Parliament.  Byrne held the seat until his death in 1942.

References 

1942 deaths
Members of the House of Commons of Northern Ireland 1929–1933
Members of the House of Commons of Northern Ireland 1933–1938
Members of the House of Commons of Northern Ireland 1938–1945
Nationalist Party (Ireland) members of the House of Commons of Northern Ireland
Year of birth missing
British publicans
Members of the House of Commons of Northern Ireland for Belfast constituencies